Seal Rocks is a small coastal settlement in the Mid-Coast Council local government area, in the Mid North Coast region of New South Wales, Australia,  north-north-east of Sydney. It is famous for its many premier surfing beaches (including Lighthouse Beach, Treachery and Yagon), and also for being the home of Seal Rocks lighthouse, officially known as Sugarloaf Point Lighthouse. At the 2021 census, the area had a population of 56 persons.

History
Prior to European settlement, the area that is now Seal Rocks was occupied by the Worimi Aboriginal people

On 2 June 1864, the Rainbow was wrecked on Seal Rocks.

The Sugarloaf Point Light was installed and lit on 1 December 1875. In 1923, the lighthouse converted from kerosene to acetylene gas. The lighthouse was electrified in June 1966. By 1987, the lighthouse had been automated and no longer required staffed keepers.

In 1895 the SS Catterthun, heading for China from Sydney, was wrecked on the rocks and 54 (31?) passengers and crew drowned.

Heritage listings 
Seal Rocks has a number of heritage-listed sites, including: 
 Seal Rocks Road, Myall Lakes National Park: Sugarloaf Point Light

Resistance to commercialisation 

Seal Rocks is well known for its peaceful resistance to attempts by developers to commercialise the small picturesque fishing village.
On entering the town by the road, the slogan "Save Seal Rocks The Last Frontier" can be seen painted on the road itself, this has been continually repainted for over 30 years.
Currently the local council is making an attempt to commercialise the small caravan park, and a movement is once again growing against this.

The 2013 movie Adore was filmed at this location.

Seal colony
Seal Rocks was named after the Australian fur seals that were often seen on the rocks near the Sugarloaf Point Lighthouse.  There is some evidence that a breeding colony of seals once existed at Seal Rocks, although the species no longer breeds in NSW and the colony was lost.  However, more recently sightings have been increasing in the Port Stephens area.

Sugarloaf Point Lighthouse 

The construction of Sugarloaf Lighthouse was completed in 1875, ten years after it was recommended a light be placed to highlight the treacherous Seal Rocks. It was originally intended to place the light on Seal Rocks but landing was difficult and so the proposition was abandoned.

The tower is constructed of brick, rendered and painted white.

The light was upgraded in 1923 and was converted from kerosene to acetylene gas. Electricity was introduced in 1966 and the light was kept staffed for many years despite automation in 1987.

The Sugarloaf lighthouse is the second-most easterly one in Australia, after the Byron Bay lighthouse, and offers accommodation in three cottages.

Although some reports state that 54 persons lost their lives, the NSW marine board of inquiry listed 31 as the correct number.

References

External links

 

Towns in the Hunter Region
Suburbs of Mid-Coast Council
Mid North Coast
Coastal towns in New South Wales